A list of films produced in Egypt in 2017. For an A-Z list of films currently on Wikipedia, see :Category:Egyptian films.

References

External links 
 Egyptian films of 2017 at the Internet Movie Database
 Egyptian films of 2017 elCinema.com

Lists of Egyptian films by year
2017 in Egypt
Lists of 2017 films by country or language